The 2005–06 Bangladeshi cricket season featured the inaugural Test series in Bangladesh between Bangladesh and Australia.

Honours
 National Cricket League – Rajshahi Division
 One-Day League – Rajshahi Division
 Most runs – Ehsanul Haque 955 @ 59.68 (HS 138)
 Most wickets – Hasibul Hossain 57 @ 16.00 (BB 6–62)

Test series
Australia played 2 Test matches and 3 limited overs internationals, winning all five games comfortably.  For information about this tour, see: Australian cricket team in Bangladesh in 2005-06.

See also
 History of cricket in Bangladesh

Further reading
 Wisden Cricketers' Almanack 2007

External sources
 Miscellaneous articles re Bangladesh cricket
 CricInfo re Bangladesh
 CricketArchive re tournaments in Bangladesh

2005 in Bangladeshi cricket
2006 in Bangladeshi cricket
Bangladeshi cricket seasons from 2000–01
Domestic cricket competitions in 2005–06